Tavrichanka is a rural locality (a selo) in Tomsky Selsoviet of Seryshevsky District, Amur Oblast, Russia. The population was 295 as of 2018. There are 4 streets.

Geography 
Tavrichanka is located on the Tom River, 28 km southwest of Seryshevo (the district's administrative centre) by road. Tomskoye is the nearest rural locality.

References 

Rural localities in Seryshevsky District